Palamut may refer to:

 Palamut (tuna), the Atlantic bonito
 Palamut, Manisa, former municipality in Manisa Province, Turkey, more commonly known as Zeytinliova
 Palamut, Tekirdağ, a village in Tekirdağ Province, Turkey